Castaing is a surname. Notable people with the surname include:

Edme Castaing (1796–1823), French physician and murderer
Francis Castaing (born 1957), French bicycle racer
François Castaing (born 1945), French automotive executive
Jacques Chastenet de Castaing (1893–1978), French journalist, historian and diplomat
Jean Castaing, French inventor and mint official
Jean Castaing (playwright) (1723–1805), printer and playwright
Lucien Castaing-Taylor (born 1966), British anthropologist and artist
Madeleine Castaing (1894–1992), French antique dealer and interior designer

See also
Castang (disambiguation)
Casting (disambiguation)